Puffballs are a type of fungus featuring a ball-shaped fruit body that bursts on impact, releasing a cloud of dust-like spores when mature. Puffballs belong to the division Basidiomycota and encompass several genera, including Calvatia, Calbovista and Lycoperdon. The puffballs were previously treated as a taxonomic group called the Gasteromycetes or Gasteromycetidae, but they are now known to be a polyphyletic assemblage.

The distinguishing feature of all puffballs is that they do not have an open cap with spore-bearing gills. Instead, spores are produced internally, in a spheroidal fruit body called a gasterothecium (gasteroid 'stomach-like' basidiocarp). As the spores mature, they form a mass called a gleba in the centre of the fruitbody that is often of a distinctive color and texture. The basidiocarp remains closed until after the spores have been released from the basidia. Eventually, it develops an aperture, or dries, becomes brittle, and splits, and the spores escape. The spores of puffballs are statismospores rather than ballistospores, meaning they are not forcibly extruded from the basidium. Puffballs and similar forms are thought to have evolved convergently (that is, in numerous independent events) from Hymenomycetes by gasteromycetation, through secotioid stages. Thus, 'Gasteromycetes' and 'Gasteromycetidae' are now considered to be descriptive, morphological terms (more properly gasteroid or gasteromycetes, to avoid taxonomic implications) but not valid cladistic terms.

True puffballs do not have a visible stalk or stem, while stalked puffballs do have a stalk that supports the gleba.  None of the stalked puffballs are edible as they are tough and woody mushrooms.  The Hymenogastrales and Enteridium lycoperdon, a slime mold, are the false puffballs.  A gleba which is powdery on maturity is a feature of true puffballs, stalked puffballs and earthstars. False puffballs are hard like rock or brittle.  All false puffballs are inedible, as they are tough and bitter to taste. The genus Scleroderma, which has a young purple gleba, should also be avoided.

Puffballs were traditionally used in Tibet for making ink by burning them, grinding the ash, then putting them in water and adding glue liquid and "a nye shing ma decoction", which, when pressed for a long time, made a black dark substance that was used as ink. Rural Americans likewise burned the common puffball with some kind of bee smoker to anesthetize honey bees as a means to safely procure honey; the practice later inspired experimental medicinal application of the puffball smoke as a surgical general anesthetic in 1853.

Edibility and identification

While most puffballs are not poisonous, some often look similar to young agarics, and especially the deadly Amanitas, such as the death cap or destroying angel mushrooms. Young puffballs in the edible stage, before maturation of the gleba,  have undifferentiated white flesh within; whereas the gills of immature Amanita mushrooms can be seen if they are closely examined. These can be very toxic.

The giant puffball, Calvatia gigantea (earlier classified as Lycoperdon giganteum), reaches a foot (30 cm) or more in diameter, and is difficult to mistake for any other fungus. It has been estimated that a large specimen of this fungus when mature will produce around 7 × 10¹² spores.

Not all true puffball mushrooms are without stalks. Some may also be stalked like the Podaxis pistillaris which is also called the "false shaggy mane". There are also a number of false puffballs that look similar to the true ones.

Stalked puffballs
Stalked puffballs species:
Battarrea phalloides
Calostoma cinnabarina (Stalked Puffball-in-Aspic)
Pisolithus tinctorius
Tulostoma (genus)

True puffballs
True puffballs genera and species:
Bovista — various species, including:
Bovista aestivalis
Bovista dermoxantha
Bovista nigrescens
Bovista plumbea
Calvatia — various species, including:
Calvatia bovista
Calvatia craniiformis
Calvatia cyathiformis
Calvatia gigantea
Calvatia booniana
Calvatia fumosa
Calvatia lepidophora
Calvatia pachyderma
Calvatia sculpta
Calvatia subcretacea – edible
Calbovista subsculpta
Handkea — various species, including:
Handkea utriformis
Lycoperdon — various species, including:
Lycoperdon candidum
Lycoperdon echinatum
Lycoperdon fusillum
Lycoperdon umbrinum
Scleroderma — various species, including:
Scleroderma auratium
Scleroderma geaster – not edible

False puffballs
False puffballs species:
Endoptychum agaricoides
Nivatogastrium nubigenum
Podaxis pistillaris
Rhizopogon rubescens
Truncocolumella citrina

Classification

Major orders:
 Agaricales (including now-obsolete orders Lycoperdales, Tulostomatales, and Nidulariales)Basidiomycetes : Agaricales : Lycoperdaceae : Calvatia
Calvatia booniana -
Calvatia bovista (Handkea utriformis)
Calvatia craniiformis -
Calvatia cyathiformis -
Calvatia fumosa (Handkea fumosa) -
Calvatia gigantea -
Calvatia lepidophora -
Calvatia rubroflava -
Calvatia sculpta -
Calvatia subcretacea (Handkea subcretacea) -
Basidiomycetes : Agaricales : Lycoperdaceae : Lycoperdon
Lycoperdon foetidum (Lycoperdon nigrescens)
Lycoperdon perlatum  -
Lycoperdon pulcherrimum -
Lycoperdon pusillum
Lycoperdon pyriforme
Basidiomycetes : Agaricales : Lycoperdaceae : Vascellum
Vascellum curtisii -
Vascellum pratense - edible when interior is white
 Geastrales and Phallales (related to Cantharellales),
Basidiomycetes : Phallales : Geastraceae : Geastrum
Geastrum coronatum
Geastrum fornicatum
Geastrum saccatum -
 Sclerodermatales (related to Boletales')
Basidiomycetes : Boletales : Sclerodermataceae : SclerodermaScleroderma areolatum -Scleroderma bovista -Scleroderma cepaScleroderma citrinum -Scleroderma meridionale -Scleroderma michiganense -Scleroderma polyrhizum -Scleroderma septentrionale'' -
 and various false-truffles (hypogaeic gasteromycetes) related to different hymenomycete orders.

Similarly, the true truffles (Tuberales) are gasteroid Ascomycota. Their ascocarps are called tuberothecia.

Footnotes

References
 Homobasidiomycetes at the Tree of Life Web Project

External links

 
Edible fungi
Fungus common names
Basidiomycota
Mushroom types